The 2012 Volta ao Algarve was the 38th edition of the Volta ao Algarve cycling stage race. It was held from 15–19 February 2012, and was rated as a 2.1 event on the UCI Europe Tour.

Porte's winning margin over runner-up Tony Martin – the defending race winner – was 37 seconds, and Porte's team-mate Bradley Wiggins completed the podium, seven seconds behind Martin and 44 seconds down on Porte. In the race's other classifications, 's Edvald Boasson Hagen won the points classification,  pairing Sérgio Sousa and Raúl Alarcón won the mountains and sprints classifications respectively, and  finished at the head of the teams classification.

Teams and cyclists
20 teams competed in the 2012 Volta ao Algarve. Among them were 11 UCI ProTour teams, four UCI Professional Continental teams, and five Continental teams.

The teams competing were:

UCI ProTour Teams

UCI Professional Continental Teams

UCI Continental Teams

Stages

Stage 1
15 February 2012 — Dunas Douradas to Albufeira,

Stage 2
16 February 2012 — Faro to Lagoa,

Stage 3
17 February 2012 — Castro Marim to Alto do Malhão,

Stage 4
18 February 2012 — Vilamoura to Tavira,

Stage 5
19 February 2012 — Lagoa to Portimão, individual time trial (ITT)

Classification leadership

References

External links
 

2012 UCI Europe Tour
2012
Volta ao Algrave